Étienne Binet (1569 – 1639) was a Jesuit author of 45 published works.  He was born in Dijon, France, and died in Paris.

Binet entered the Society of Jesus in 1590 and was rector of the colleges at Rouen and Paris, and provincial of Paris, Lyons, and Champagne. He was the author of forty-five published works, the first of which, on devotion to the Blessed Virgin, passed through eleven editions. His "Flowers from the Psalms" (Rouen, 1615) was translated into Italian and Latin; "Consolation and Joy for the Sick and Afflicted" (Rouen, 1616), was republished fourteen times in eight years; an "Essay on Nature's Wonders" (Rouen, 1621) was one of the most popular scientific works of the century; it passed through 24 editions before 1658. Father Binet published a "Life of St. Ignatius" and a "Life of St. Francis Xavier," in 1622, when these saints were canonized. His "Vies es SS. Elzear et Dauphine" was translated into English (London, 1638); "Vie de Ste. Aldegonde was published in English at Paris in 1632; "Purgatory Surveyed," a translation by Father Ashby (London, 1663) was brought out again by Father Anderdon (London, 1874); "The Rich Man Saved by the Golden Gate of Heaven; Motives and Power of Almsgiving" (Paris, 1627) is dedicated to his mother, who was still living at the age of eighty-five (Latin, Italian, and German translations of this work were published); "Mary, God's Masterpiece" (Paris, 1634) had six editions. Two years later he published a work which was received with the greatest enthusiasm: "How Should Religious Superiors Govern?" Twelve editions editions of this were published in French, three in Latin, three in Italian, and one in German. "Divine Favors Granted to St. Joseph" (Paris, 1639) was translated into English (London, 1890).

Father Binet's works are marked by a clear, graceful style, and quite an original turn of thought; they abound in apt quotations from Scriptures and the Fathers; although written 250 years ago they still furnish both pleasurable and profitable spiritual reading. Father Binet was the school-fellow and life-long friend of St. Francis de Sales, whose cheerful spirituality his own so much resembles.

Books published (partial list)
Life of St. Ignatius
Life of St. Francis Xavier
Flowers from the Psalms
Essay on Nature's Wonders
Purgatory Surveyed
Mary, God's Masterpiece
The Rich Man Saved by the Golden Gate of Heaven; Motives and Power of Almsgiving
Divine Favors Granted to St. Joseph

References

1569 births
1639 deaths
Writers from Dijon
French religious writers
16th-century French Jesuits
French male non-fiction writers
Clergy from Dijon